The linothorax (pronounced ; from the  ) is a type of upper body armor that was used throughout the ancient Mediterranean world. These are usually equated with some of the armours showed in sculptures and paintings from Italy and Greece from 575 BCE onwards. Very little is known about how ancient linen armour was made. Linen armour in other cultures was usually quilted and stuffed with loose fibre or stitched together many layers thick, but it could also have been made with a special weave called twining which creates a thick, tough fabric. The theory that it was made of layers of linen glued together comes from a mistranslation of a summary of a description of medieval armour in 1869.

By the late 6th century BCE, many paintings and sculptures show hoplites and other warriors in the Aegean wearing the linothorax instead of a bronze cuirass. This could have been due to the lower price, lesser weight, or cooler material. Artists continue to show it in the Hellenistic period after the death of Alexander the Great. The Roman emperor Caracalla equipped a "Macedonian phalanx" with linen armour around 200 CE (Cassius Dio 78.7).

History 

Some scholars believe that Homer refers to a linothorax when he describes Ajax the Lesser as "linen-breasted" (Iliad 2.529 and 2.830). Other scholars believe that this refers to a linen tunic or smooth glossy skin.

The first clear reference to linen armour in any ancient language is a line by the poet Alcaeus, who lived around 650–550 BCE. From the fifth century BCE to the first century CE, Greek and Roman writers mention soldiers from many nations wearing linen armour, but they rarely describe it in detail.  These writers include Herodotus (2.182, 3.47, 7.63), Livy (4.19.2–20.7), Strabo (Geography, 3.3.6, 13.1.10), Suetonius (Galba 19.1), and Pausanias. The philosopher Plutarch says that Alexander the Great wore a "double linen breastplate" at the battle of Gaugamela (Plutarch, Life of Alexander 32.8-12). References to linen armour become much rarer in the Roman imperial period. It seems likely that as the Roman army developed cheap forms of iron armour such as the lorica hamata, there was less demand for linen armour.

Beginning around 575 BCE, artists in the Aegean often show a distinctive style of armour with a smooth piece wrapped around the chest, two flaps over the shoulders, and a skirt of flaps covering the hips and belly. By the 4th century BCE armour with a similar shape appears in wall paintings in Italy, sealstones in Persia, gold combs in Crimea, and stone carvings in Gaul. Because only a few examples of armour shaped like this survive, researchers such as Peter Connolly identify the lost armour with the linen armour in texts. Linen would decay and so leave little archaeological evidence. On the Alexander Sarcophagus and Alexander Mosaic, Alexander the Great and his soldiers wear this type of armour. Artists of the Roman imperial period rarely show this type of armour. The extant armour with this shape are made of iron plate, iron scales, or iron mail, and so the armour which decayed was likely made of more than one material.

Researchers at the University of Wisconsin-Green Bay built and tested some glued linen armour. Their copy was resistant to broad-head arrows and slashing damage of weapons with sharp edges. The bend of the fabric would allow the energy of the arrows to dissipate through the material and protect the user from lacerations, and arrows that struck at an angle would often deflect to penetrate a space between different layers of linen, rather than penetrating the linen itself. Blunt force trauma would still transfer through the armor, however, and possibly damage the internal organs of the soldier.

Depictions 

Since this armour is only known through texts, paintings, and sculptures, rather than archaeological finds, modern scholars can only guess at its makeup and design. Artistic depictions show armor that has a top piece which covers the shoulders and is tied down on the chest, a main body piece wrapping around the wearer and covering the chest from the waist up, and a row of pteruges or flaps around the bottom which cover the belly and hips. Vase paintings from Athens often show scales covering part of the armour. A team of researchers at the University of Wisconsin–Green Bay lead by Professor Emeritus Gregory S. Aldrete have catalogued art from Italy and the Aegean which shows this armour. Five extant pieces of armour shaped like the armour in Athenian vase paintings survive from sites in south-eastern Europe from the 4th century BCE to the 1st century CE. Two are of iron plate, one is of iron scales on a leather foundation, and two are of mail interwoven with scales. Some of the linen armour in ancient texts was probably shaped the same way, but how this ancient linen armour was made is unknown.

Research 

Modern researchers have had difficulty studying ancient linen armor because linen is biodegradable and leaves few remains for archeologists to discover.  In recent times, many cultures from India to Scotland to South America made linen armour by quilting many layers of fabric together or stuffing them with loose fibres such as cotton.  The type stuffed with loose fibres often looks bumpy and unlike the ancient art, but the type of many layers of cloth can be smooth.  Textile archaeologist Hero Granger-Taylor proposes that ancient linen armour was woven using a special technique called twining. Twined textiles were used in military contexts in Bronze Age Egypt, Roman Syria, and Maori New Zealand, so it is plausible that they were also used in Classical Greece and Italy before the Roman conquest.

In the 1970s, Peter Connolly built a linothorax by gluing layers of linen cloth together and cutting them to shape. His reconstruction inspired many other reconstructions including one by Professor Emeritus Gregory S. Aldrete and his student Scott Bartell.  This project was present at the joint American Philological Association/Archaeological Institute of America Convention held in Philadelphia, Pennsylvania in January 2009, and published in a book from Johns Hopkins University Press in 2013. The project received considerable media attention after Aldrete tested his construction by shooting an arrow at Bartell with cameras rolling. But Peter Connolly's reconstruction was based on a misremembered, twice-translated summary of a Byzantine chronicle which did not mention glue, not on an ancient text, artifact, or depiction.  No culture before the 20th century is known to have made linen armor in this way.

See also 

 Gambeson
 Kevlar
 Muscle cuirass

References

External links 

 
 
 Recreating the Linothorax
  (in Greek)
  (in Greek)

Ancient Greek military terminology
Ancient Greek military equipment
Body armor